Stockingford is a suburb of the town of Nuneaton, in the county of Warwickshire, England, approximately  west of the town centre. 

Stockingford first appeared in records in 1157, named Stoccingford, derived from the Old English Stocc; to root up trees. It therefore has its origin as a clearance in a wood, by a ford across a stream. It was historically a small village within the of the old parish of Nuneaton. In the early 19th century the area became industrialised, with several collieries and brickworks, and the population expanded rapidly. In 1824, the church of St Paul's was built, originally as a chapel of ease to the main church in Nuneaton, in order to cater for the growing population. Stockingford became a separate ecclesiastical parish in 1846, and St Paul's church became a parish church. 

Stockingford was historically served by its own railway station on the Birmingham to Nuneaton line, which was opened in 1864, and closed in 1968. There have been proposals to reopen the station in recent years.

Stockingford was mentioned in George Eliot's novel Scenes of Clerical Life as 'Paddiford Common'.

The area is adjacent to Whittleford Park, a public park and nature reserve, reclaimed from former industrial land in the 2000s.

References

External links
 Stockingford archives – Our Warwickshire

Areas of Nuneaton